Cham-e Zin (also Romanized as Cham-e Zīn and Chamzīn) is a village in Saman Rural District, Saman County, Chaharmahal and Bakhtiari Province, Iran. At the 2006 census, its population was 691, in 191 families. The village is populated by Turkic people.

References 

Populated places in Saman County